AMBAC may refer to:
 Ambac Financial Group, a bankrupt American financial services company
 American Bosch Arma Corporation, an American branch of the Bosch Gmbh
 Active Mass Balance Auto Control, a component of Universal Century technology in the fictional Gundam universe that allows for movement in zero gravity without thrusters
 Asociación Mexicana de Bibliotecarios